Matryono-Gezovo is a rural locality (a selo) and the administrative center of Matryonogezovskoye Rural Settlement, Alexeyevsky District, Belgorod Oblast, Russia. The population was 882 as of 2010. There are 7 streets.

Geography 
Matryono-Gezovo is located 16 km east of Alexeyevka (the district's administrative centre) by road. Batlukov is the nearest rural locality.

References 

Rural localities in Alexeyevsky District, Belgorod Oblast
Biryuchensky Uyezd